"Behind the Lines" is a song by the English progressive rock band Genesis, from their 1980 album Duke. The group's drummer and vocalist Phil Collins released a re-recorded version on his first solo album Face Value in February 1981.

Different versions
The Genesis version of the track is a dramatic art-rock piece, while the Collins' version is lighter and played in a funk style. Lyrically, the song is about pleading to a former lover, a subject that fitted smoothly into Collins' post-divorce solo album. There were a few minor changes to the words, however.

Collins revealed on the Classic Albums documentary on Face Value that his solo remake came about after "recording 'Behind the Lines', we ran the tape back at double speed and suddenly this other song appeared". Collins then set out to re-record the song on Face Value as a Michael Jackson Off the Wall-era disco track featuring the Earth, Wind and Fire horn section, the Phenix Horns.

An edited version appeared as the B-side to "Turn It On Again", the lead single from Duke. This version is billed as "Behind the Lines – Part 2", as it edited out the long instrumental introduction to the song, and is in essence the second half of the original recording.

Tours
"Behind the Lines" was performed on the accompanying tour in 1980, and was also played as the show opener during the Abacab tour in 1981. The song was also played in full (in a medley, between "Dance on a Volcano" and "Follow You Follow Me") on the 1982 Encore tour, and a shorter version was included in an old medley ("Eleventh Earl of Mar"/"Behind the Lines"/"Firth of Fifth"/"The Musical Box") during January 1984 for the Mama Tour. The song was rehearsed and considered as the show opener for the We Can't Dance '92 tour.

The instrumental intro was used as an opener on the 2007 Turn It On Again tour. Tony Banks wanted to perform the full version, but Mike Rutherford and Phil Collins disagreed with him. Collins performed his solo version on his Hello I Must Be Going '83, No Jacket Required '85, But Seriously '90 and Both Sides '94/'95 tours.

The Duke Suite

"Behind the Lines" was originally part of a long suite by the band including "Duchess", "Guide Vocal", "Turn it on Again" "Duke's Travels" and "Duke's End". However, it was split up before release.

Personnel
Tony Banks – keyboards, backing vocals
Phil Collins – drums, percussion, lead vocals
Mike Rutherford – guitar, bass, backing vocals

References

Genesis (band) songs
Phil Collins songs
1980 songs
Songs written by Phil Collins
Songs written by Tony Banks (musician)
Songs written by Mike Rutherford